Akróasis (stylized "Akrøasis" in the cover) is the fourth album by German technical death metal band Obscura. It was released on February 5, 2016 through Relapse Records. A music video was released for the album's title track on November 19, 2015. A second music video for the song "Ten Sepiroth" was released through VEVO, MTV & VH-1 on June 20, 2016.

Track listing

Personnel 
Obscura
 Steffen Kummerer - guitar, vocals
 Tom Geldschläger - guitar
 Linus Klausenitzer - bass
 Sebastian Lanser - drums

Additional Personnel
 V. Santura - Production, Engineering, Mixing, Mastering
 Dejan Djukovic - Engineering
 Jan Vacik - Engineering
 Thies Neu - Engineering
 Maria Bullok - Additional vocals on "Ode to the Sun"
 Monika Bullok - Additional vocals on "Ode to the Sun"
 Matthias Preisinger - Violin, viola, and orchestral arrangement on "Weltseele"
 Jupp Wegener - Cello on "Weltseele"
 Phillipp Rohmer - Double bass on "Weltseele"
 Orion Landau - Artwork
Music arranged by Obscura

Charts
Akroasis landed at number five on the Top Heatseekers album chart, which lists the best-selling albums by new and developing artists, defined as those who have never appeared in the top 100 of The Billboard 200. Loudwire awarded Akroasis as "Best Metal Song of 2016". Whatculture awarded "The Monist" as "Best Heavy Metal Song of 2016". The Metalist awarded "Akroasis" as "Best Release of 2016".

References 

2016 albums
Obscura (band) albums
Relapse Records albums